FC Ifeanyi Ubah is a football club in Nigeria. It was founded following the acquisition of Gabros international Football Club by Sen. Patrick Ifeanyi Ubah. The Club was originally known as Iyayi Football Club of Benin City, before its acquisition by Chief Gabriel Chukwuma and renamed Gabros International Football Club.

FC Ifeanyi Ubah has its headquarters at 21 Nnobi Road, Nnewi, Anambra State.

On 6 November 2016, the club defeated Nasarawa United FC on penalties to clinch a historic Federation Cup at Teslim Balogun Stadium, Lagos. Since the split of Anambra State in 1991, no football club from the State had ever won the trophy.

F.C. Ifeanyi Ubah is one of the few privately run football clubs in the country.  The club has gained massive success as a newly formed club garnering droves of fans all around the south eastern part of Nigeria and around the Country at large.

The Media Officer of the Club is Engr Ikenna Nwokedi while the Stadium Announcer is Josh Immanuel Ike-Okoli.

Current (2016–17) squad

Achievements
Nigeria National League: 2014
NEROS Anambra FA CUP: 2015, 2016, 2017, 2018
Nigerian Federation Cup: 2016

References

External links

Football clubs in Anambra State
Association football clubs established in 2015
2015 establishments in Nigeria
Sports clubs in Nigeria